Leupp Schools, Inc., is a K-12 grant-funded school affiliated with the Bureau of Indian Education. It is in Leupp, Arizona and has a Winslow postal address. Its GNIS is 7538.

It is the mission of the Leupp Schools, Inc. to prepare and empower all students for the choices and challenges they will face in the future by providing a positive, healthy, social and educational environment which is based on Dine’ knowledge and language.

In 1976 there was a proposal for the Leupp Boarding School to become a district public school of the Flagstaff Unified School District. In a letter to the editor to the Arizona Daily Sun the principal Allen H. Ross disputed that his own school was proposing such.

References

External links
  

Native American schools in Arizona
Public elementary schools in Arizona
Public middle schools in Arizona
Public high schools in Arizona
Public K-12 schools in the United States
Non-profit organizations based in Arizona
Schools in Coconino County, Arizona
Education on the Navajo Nation